The Nkusi River is in the Bunyoro sub-region, in the Western Region of Uganda.

Location
The Nkusi River begins in the hills west of the town of Kakumiro in the Kakumiro District. It flows in a north-westerly direction to enter a swamp near the village of Kitoma, in the Kibaale District. The river emerges from this swamp and flows westwards to empty into Lake Albert at the border with the Democratic Republic of the Congo.

In the swamp near Kitoma, the Nkusi River briefly joins the River Kafu. The River Kafu, however, flows out of the swamp in a north-easterly direction and finally empties into the Victoria Nile, near the town of Masindi Port in Masindi District.

External links
Rivers and Lakes of Uganda

See also
Kibale National Park

References

Rivers of Uganda
Kibaale District
Lake Albert (Africa)